Cactobrosis fernaldialis, the blue cactus borer, is a species of snout moth in the genus Cactobrosis. It was described by George Duryea Hulst in 1886, and is found from Texas to southern California, where it inhabits deserts.

The wingspan is 36–47 mm for males and 34–50 mm for females. The forewings are narrow and gray, usually with a black streak in males that is lacking in females. Both sexes have a whitish antemedial fascia bordered by dark gray distally, and sometimes the whole basal area is black. Adults are on wing from late March to April and again from July to November.

The larvae feed on Ferocactus wislizeni. They feed in the base of the flower buds and also tunnel into the plant providing an open wound which may lead to bacterial infection and necrosis of the host plant.

References

Moths described in 1886
Phycitini